Edmond Bacri known by the professional name Eddy Marnay (Algiers, 18 December 1920 – 3 January 2003), was a French songwriter. In his career, he wrote more than 4000 songs, including works for Édith Piaf, Frida Boccara and Céline Dion. He was joint winner, as lyricist, of the Eurovision Song Contest in 1969 for "Un Jour, Un Enfant", sung by Frida Boccara.  He also wrote the title song for Charlie Chaplin's 1957 film A King in New York.

Céline Dion named one of her twin sons after him in 2010, as Marnay produced and helped write Dion's first five records.

References

Further reading

1920 births
2003 deaths
Burials at Montmartre Cemetery
Pieds-Noirs
Algerian emigrants to France
French composers
French male composers
People from Algiers
Eurovision Song Contest winners
20th-century French musicians
20th-century French male musicians